The Leyenda de Plata (2011)''' was professional wrestling tournament produced by the Mexican wrestling promotion Consejo Mundial de Lucha Libre (CMLLl; Spanish "World Wrestling Council") that ran from September 23, 2011, over the course of three of CMLL's Friday night shows in Arena México with the finals on October 7, 2011. The annual Leyenda de Plata tournament is held in honor of lucha libre legend El Santo and is one of CMLL's most important annual tournaments.

After a two-year hiatus, the eleventh Leyenda de Plata returned in 2011. With the winner of the three previous Leyenda de Platas, Místico, having signed a contract with WWE in January 2011, CMLL eliminated the final stage of the tournament, meaning that the winners of the torneo cibernetico elimination match qualified straight for the finals. The first cibernetico took place on September 23 and was won by Volador Jr., who outlasted Delta, Guerrero Maya Jr., La Máscara, Metal Blanco, Palacio Negro, Pólvora, Puma King, Shigeo Okumura, Stuka Jr., Tiger and Valiente. The second cibernetico took place on September 30 at CMLL's 78th Anniversary Show and was won by Jushin Thunder Liger, who outlasted Diamante, Dragón Rojo Jr., Fuego, Hijo del Signo, Olímpico, Máscara Dorada, Mephisto, Metro, Rey Escorpión, Sangre Azteca and Virus. On October 7, Volador Jr. defeated Jushin Thunder Liger to win the 2011 Leyenda de Plata.

Production
Background
The Leyenda de Plata (Spanish for "the Silver Legend") is an annual lucha libre tournament scripted and promoted by the Mexican professional wrestling promotion Consejo Mundial de Lucha Libre (CMLL).  The first Leyenda de Plata was held in 1998 and was in honor of El Santo, nicknamed Enmáscarado de Plata (the Silver mask) from which the tournament got its name. The trophy given to the winner is a plaque with a metal replica of the mask that El Santo wore in both wrestling and lucha films.

The Leyenda de Plata was held annually until 2003, at which point El Santo's son, El Hijo del Santo left CMLL on bad terms. The tournament returned in 2004 and has been held on an almost annual basis since then. The original format of the tournament was the Torneo cibernetico elimination match to qualify for a semi-final. The winner of the semi-final would face the winner of the previous year's tournament in the final. Since 2005 CMLL has held two cibernetico matches and the winner of each then meet in the semi-final. In 2011, the tournament was modified to eliminate the final stage as the previous winner, Místico, did not work for CMLL at that point in time The 2011 edition of La Leyenda de Plata was the 11th overall tournament held by CMLL.

Storylines
The events featured a total of number of professional wrestling matches with different wrestlers involved in pre-existing scripted feuds, plots and storylines. Wrestlers were portrayed as either heels (referred to as rudos in Mexico, those that portray the "bad guys") or faces (técnicos'' in Mexico, the "good guy" characters) as they followed a series of tension-building events, which culminated in a wrestling match or series of matches.

Tournament overview

Cibernetico 1

Cibernetico 2

Results

September 23, 2011

September 30, 2011

October 7, 2011

References

2011 in professional wrestling
Leyenda de Plata
Events in Mexico City
October 2011 events in Mexico